Greenfield status (also known as "unrestricted re-use") is an end point wherein a parcel of land that had been in industrial use is, in principle, restored to the conditions existing before the construction of the plant.

All power plants, coal, gas, and nuclear, have a finite life beyond which it is no longer economical to operate them. At this point they must be decommissioned; that is, they must be dismantled and their components disposed of either by sale or scrapping. In some cases the buildings that housed the plant may be put to other uses. However, in many cases contamination is unacceptable and the buildings must be demolished. The land on which the plant sat also may have been polluted with high levels of toxins, and in this case other remedial measures like removal and replacement of the top soil or clay capping may be required to render the site safe in perpetuity.

It is becoming standard practice in many jurisdictions to mandate a return to greenfield status at the end of plant service as a condition of the initial site license, and potential licensees must demonstrate that steps will be taken to assure the availability of funds via the posting of a reclamation bond for that task before a site-license will be issued. While this concept has mainly applied to the power generating industry, it is coming into wider use in other areas of industrial decommissioning.

See also
Brownfield status
Environmental remediation
Greenfield land
Nuclear decommissioning

References

Remediation of Contaminated Areas: An Overview of International Guidance
Experiences and Techniques in the Decommissioning of Old Nuclear Power Plants
RECLAMATION BONDS AND DEVELOPMENT

Urban studies and planning terminology